Kim Si-woo (born 26 June 1997) is a South Korean footballer who plays for Gwangju FC.

References

1997 births
Living people
South Korean footballers
K League 1 players
K League 2 players
Gwangju FC players
Association football forwards